

This list of African American historic places in Omaha, Nebraska features some sites on the National Register of Historic Places (NRHP) as independent sites or as part of larger historic district. Others have been designated Omaha Landmarks (OL).

Places

Community places 

 Jewell Building - NRHP
 John Beasley Theater (no longer in operation)
 Love’s Jazz and Art Center
 North 24th Street

Economic places 

 Carver Savings and Loan Association
 Fair Deal Cafe
 Omaha Star building - NRHP
 Webster Telephone Exchange Building (Great Plains Black History Museum) - NRHP

Neighborhoods 

 Kountze Place
 Miller Park
 Near North Side
 Prospect Hill
 Saratoga

Churches 

 Calvin Memorial Presbyterian Church - NRHP
 Holy Family Catholic Church - NRHP
 Pearl Memorial United Methodist Church
 Sacred Heart Catholic Church - NRHP
 St. John's African Methodist Episcopal Church - NRHP
 Zion Baptist Church

Schools 

 Central High School
 Howard Kennedy School
 Kellom School
 Lake School
 Long School
 Lothrop School
 North High
 Tech High

Houses 

 Broomfield Rowhouse - NRHP
 Harry Buford House - NRHP
 Lizzie Robinson House - NRHP
 Logan Fontenelle Housing Projects
 Malcolm X House Site - NRHP
 Strehlow Terrace/Chambers Court - NRHP

See also 

 African Americans in Omaha, Nebraska
 Architecture in Omaha, Nebraska
 History of North Omaha, Nebraska

References

External links
 "Omaha Black Heritage Sites" on NorthOmahaHistory.com includes 165 locations, addresses and references in Omaha.

Omaha, Nebraska-related lists
 
Ethnic groups in Omaha, Nebraska
History of Omaha, Nebraska
Omaha, Nebraska
Place names
Historic sites in Nebraska